Jordi Vanlerberghe (born 27 June 1996) is a Belgian professional footballer who plays as a defensive midfielder or centre-back for KV Mechelen in the Belgian Pro League. Vanlerberghe started his professional career as a striker.

Club career 
Vanlerberghe made his Belgian Pro League debut on 27 October 2012 in the derby against Lierse. He replaced Nicklas Pedersen as an 88th-minute substitute. He scored his first professional goal on 25 January 2014 against Mons.

In June 2017, Vanlerberghe was signed on a four-year deal by Club Brugge. There, he failed to gain a starting spot under head coach Ivan Leko, as the club won the Belgian league title. In July 2018, it was therefore decided to loan him out to Oostende, where he was reunited with Gert Verheyen, his former coach with the Belgian U23 team. Vanlerberghe played a good season in Ostend where he was a regular starter. At the end of the season, he returned to Club Brugge.

On 10 August 2019, Vanlerberghe returned to Mechelen on a one-year loan with an option to purchase. At the end of the 2019–20 season, he returned to Bruges once more, but on 29 June 2020, it was announced that he would rejoin his former team Mechelen again on permanent basis.

Career statistics

Club

Honours
Club Brugge
 Belgian First Division A: 2017–18

References

External links

1996 births
Living people
Belgian footballers
K.V. Mechelen players
Club Brugge KV players
K.V. Oostende players
Belgian Pro League players
Belgium under-21 international footballers
Belgium youth international footballers
Association football midfielders
People from Duffel
Footballers from Antwerp Province